Leron Lee (born March 4, 1948) is an American former professional left fielder. He played eight seasons with the St. Louis Cardinals, Los Angeles Dodgers, Cleveland Indians and San Diego Padres of Major League Baseball (MLB). He then played eleven seasons in Japan's Nippon Professional Baseball for the Lotte Orions, where he was a four-time All-Star and a four-time Best Nine Award-winner.  His nephew Derrek Lee also played in the MLB.

Early life and United States baseball career 

Lee, the oldest of six children, graduated from Grant High School in Sacramento with 36 football scholarship offers from major four-year universities. Instead, he began his professional career at 18 as the number one draft pick of the St. Louis Cardinals in September 1969 after an excellent season at Tulsa where he batted .303. His first major league hit was off Jerry Robertson of the Montreal Expos. In 1970 he had ten multi-hit games, including two games with three hits, a tie breaking home run against the Dodgers and his first major league home run off future Hall of Famer Ferguson Jenkins.

In June 1971, after three seasons with the Cardinals, Leron was traded to the San Diego Padres where he had nineteen multi-hit games, including one memorable game against Cincinnati where he had three hits, including two doubles. A home run off Cito Gaston led to a 1972 2-1 win against Pittsburgh, the same year Leron batted .300 with an amazing thirty four multi- hit games, including six three-hit games.

On July 4, 1972, Lee broke up a no-hit bid by Tom Seaver of the New York Mets. Lee singled with one out in the ninth inning.

Once again, after three seasons with the Padres, Leron was purchased by the Cleveland Indians where he had thirteen multi-hit games. In a game against the Royals he hit a home run then a grand slam to drive in all five runs for a 5-2 victory.

After signing with the Dodgers as a free agent, he remained for two seasons before ending his major league career to pursue a baseball career in Japan.

Japanese baseball career 
Following his major league career, he played for the Lotte Orions in Japan from 1977 to 1987. From his retirement to early 2018, he held the Japanese record for career batting average (players with more than 4,000 at bats). Norichika Aoki overtook him upon returning from MLB. Lee led the league in home runs and runs batted in in his first season, and won the batting title in 1980. In 1978, he invited younger brother Leon Lee (the father of former Major League Baseball player Derrek Lee) to play in Japan, and the brothers formed a feared cleanup for the Orions.

Before the arrival of Lee, foreign players mostly played in Japan when their careers were winding down. Lee revolutionized the Japanese view of foreign players by playing in Japan during his prime, raising the standard for all foreign players thereafter.

Coaching career
After retiring from Japanese baseball, he went on to become the batting coach for the Oakland Athletics in 1989 when they won the World Series. Currently, he works with the Cincinnati Reds as an advising batting coach to scouted players.

References

External links

1948 births
Living people
Arkansas Travelers players
African-American baseball coaches
African-American baseball players
American expatriate baseball players in Japan
American expatriate baseball players in Mexico
Baseball coaches from California
Baseball players from Bakersfield, California
Cleveland Indians players
Florida Instructional League Cardinals players
Los Angeles Dodgers players
Lotte Orions players
Major League Baseball left fielders
Modesto Reds players
Nippon Professional Baseball designated hitters
Nippon Professional Baseball first basemen
San Diego Padres players
St. Louis Cardinals players
Sultanes de Monterrey players
Tulsa Oilers (baseball) players
21st-century African-American people
20th-century African-American sportspeople